Tomás de Morla y Pacheco (1747–1812) was a Spanish soldier and politician, who served during the Spanish war of liberation.

Early life
Tomás was born in Jerez de la Frontera in 1747, though there is no consensus among authors on the date. He was the son of Tomas Bruno Morla and Maria Lopez Pacheco de Saavedra y Valle. 
Following family tradition he joined the military in 1764, entering the Artillery Academy at Segovia.

Career
In 1780, during the American War of Independence,  as a lieutenant of artillery, Morla took part in the Gibraltar campaign, where he was wounded. 
In 1792, during the French Revolutionary War he served in of the Army of Rousillon as Quartermaster general, serving later in various posts until in 1800 he was appointed governor of Cadiz and Captain General of Andalusia.

In 1808, following the Spanish uprising against the French, Morla took action against a French naval squadron in Cadiz Bay, forcing its surrender in June. The following month he led forces from Cadiz at the battle of Balien, when the Spanish army defeated a French advance into Andalusia. However later defeats convinced the Spanish Cortes that further resistance was useless and Morla was sent to Madrid to negotiate a capitulation. This attempt was rejected and he surrendered to the French as a prisoner of war. 

While held by the French Morla decided to enter the service of King Jose (Joseph Bonaparte, Napoleon's brother), but clashed with the French general Dupont and later retired from public life. Meanwhile the Cortes had branded him a traitor and stripped him of his awards and appointments. 
Morla died in Madrid in 1812.

Writings and scientific studies
In the period 1780 to 1792 Morla taught at the Artillery Academy at Segovia (es), and published several works on artillery, fortification, various campaigns.
His most notable work was the Tratado de Artillería of 1784, a compendium of all aspects of artillery, logistics, tactics, the manufacture and use of gunpowder. It became the standard work of the time and was translated into several languages.

Awards
Morla was awarded the Grand Cross of the Order of Charles III, was a knight of the Order of Santiago and held the ecomienda of Campo de Criptana in La Mancha. However on his defection was stripped of all honours and branded a traitor.

References

Sources
 Enrique de la Vega Viguera La Singular Vida de Tomas de Morla y Pacheco Militar y Politico Jerezano (pdf) (Spanish) 

1747 births
1812 deaths
People from Jerez de la Frontera
Spanish generals
Spanish commanders of the Napoleonic Wars
People of the French Revolutionary Wars